Lola Marois, born in Paris, also known as Lola Marois-Bigard and Lola Bigard, is a French singer and comedian.

Biography 
She was born in about 1983. Marois's father was a fashion photographer; her mother was a writer of Algerian descent. She grew up in Spain, Los Angeles and Paris, where she earned a degree in literature with a minor in theater, and a DEUG in modern literature. She then took a Cours Florent at the Oscar Sisto Academy. She made her theatrical debut at 12 playing more than 10 pieces of Parisian theater from baroque to contemporary. Next, she played comic roles in the Théâtre Comédia, Théâtre Hébertot, Théâtre Saint-Georges

In May 2011 she married comedian Jean-Marie Bigard, with the mayor of the 7th arrondissement of Paris officiating. The couple became the parents of identical twins in 2013. Five years later, in 2017, Marois started a recurring role as Ariane Hersant in Plus belle la vie, a popular soap opera. She has released an album of pop music, Lola Marois, in Spain.

Films 

 2010: Show buzz
 2016: Le Cabanon rose
 2017: Vive la crise!Jean-François Davy
 2017: Vénéneuses Jean-Pierre Mocky
 2017: Brice 3 
 2017: Chacun sa vie

Television 

 2003:  (45 episodes) – France 2
 2012: Mon histoire vraie – TF1
 2015: Groland – Canal +
 2017: À votre service (Prime time special Marseille) MCE TV
 Since 2017: Plus belle la vie – France 3
 2018: Qu'est ce qu'on attend pour être heureux – M6

Short films 

 2008: Sweet home by Yilin Yang
 2009: Filmer ou mourir by Stéphane Berthomieux
 2009: Petite soirée chez Monsieur Vaillant by Arnold De Parescau

Theatre 

 2003: A Midsummer Night's Dream, Shakespeare, Théâtre de Paris 20ème
 2008: Clérambard by Marcel Aymé, Théâtre Hébertot
 2009–2012: Couscous aux lardons by Farid Omri, Théâtre Montorgueil,
 2011: Le Coup de la cigogne de Jean-Claude Isler, mise en scène Jean-Luc Moreau, Théâtre Saint-Georges
 2012: Nuit de folie de John Zera et Hadrien Raccah – Théâtre du Gymnase
 2014: Dix ans de Mariage by Alil Varda
 2015: La Famille est dans le pré by Franck Le Hen
 2015: Bonjour Ivresse by Franck Le Hen

Discography 

 2009: Lola Marois

Books 

 2013 : À demain mes amours...Le courageux combat de mes grands prématurés (biography)
 2017 : Bad Girl (novel)

References

External links 
 
 

1982 births
Living people
French actresses
French women singers
21st-century French singers
21st-century French women